Inderøy is a municipality in Trøndelag county, Norway. It is part of the Innherad region. The administrative centre of the municipality is the village of Straumen. Other villages include Framverran, Gangstadhaugen, Hylla, Kjerknesvågen, Kjerringvik, Røra, Sakshaug, Sandvollan, Småland, Trongsundet, Utøy, Vangshylla, and Venneshamn. The municipality is primarily an agricultural community, but also has some industry.

The  municipality is the 246th largest by area out of the 356 municipalities in Norway. Inderøy is the 146th most populous municipality in Norway with a population of 6,794.

General information
Inderøy was established as a municipality on 1 January 1838 (see formannskapsdistrikt law). On 1 January 1907, the municipality was divided into three municipalities: Røra (population: 866) in the southeast, Hustad (population: 732) in the north, and Inderøy (population: 2,976) in the west. During the 1960s, there were many municipal mergers across Norway due to the work of the Schei Committee. On 1 January 1962, the three neighboring municipalities of Røra (population: 1,003), Sandvollan (population: 750), and Inderøy (population: 3,194) to form a new, larger municipality of Inderøy. On 1 January 2012, the neighboring municipality of Mosvik was merged into Inderøy. This added about 800 more residents to the municipality, bringing the total population to 6,716 people. On 1 January 2018, the municipality switched from the old Nord-Trøndelag county to the new Trøndelag county.

Name
The municipality (originally the parish) is named after the Inderøya peninsula since the parish included the whole peninsula. The name therefore meant "the inner island", referring to the peninsula which sticks out into the fjord (to contrast with the neighboring Ytterøya island which means "the outer island"). Historically, the municipal name was spelled Inderøen.

Coat of arms
The coat of arms was granted on 5 October 1984. The official blazon is "Gules, four flatfishes Or, one over two over one". This means the arms have a red field (background) and the charge is four European plaice (a type of flat fish) one over two over one. The fish design has a tincture of Or which means it is commonly colored yellow but if it is made out of metal, then gold is used. This fish design was chosen to symbolize how this type of fish was once plentiful and was one of the main sources of income for the area until around 1940. The arms were designed by Nils Aas. In 2012, the arms were re-approved after the merger of Inderøy and Mosvik Municipality. The old arms of Inderøy were chosen to continue for the new, larger municipality since fishing is still important to the culture and history of the new municipality. The four fish shown on the arms are now said to represent the four original municipalities that now make up Inderøy: Inderøy, Mosvik, Røra, and Sandvollan.

Churches
The Church of Norway has four parishes within the municipality of Inderøy. It is part of the Nord-Innherad prosti (deanery) in the Diocese of Nidaros.

History

During the Middle Ages Inderøy was called Eynni iðri, meaning the inner island, which is still the meaning of the word Inderøy. Saurshaug (now Sakshaug) was an important political centre until the 20th century. In the Middle Ages it was the centre of the county Øynafylket, also including Beitstad and Verran. The Old Sakshaug Church was opened by Archbishop Eysteinn Erlendsson in 1184 and was the county church. Many of the construction techniques used in the archbishop's cathedral Nidarosdomen in Trondheim were experimented with on Old Sakshaug Church. Also the village of Sandvollan has a church from the Middle Ages, Hustad Church.

During the late Middle Ages and until the breakup of the union between Sweden and Norway Inderøy was the seat of the Governor, Judge, and Tax Collector of Nordre Trondhjems amt, thus it was the county capital of the old Nord-Trøndelag county. The district court for the north central part of Trøndelag county is still named after Inderøy.

The city was first described by a Norwegian poet, Aasmund Olavsson Vinje, in 1860 who depicted its panorama from Rolsbakken.

Government

All municipalities in Norway, including Inderøy, are responsible for primary education (through 10th grade), outpatient health services, senior citizen services, unemployment and other social services, zoning, economic development, and municipal roads. The municipality is governed by a municipal council of elected representatives, which in turn elect a mayor.  The municipality falls under the Trøndelag District Court and the Frostating Court of Appeal.

The administrative centre of Inderøy is Straumen where most of the commercial services are based. There are several boroughs in Inderøy: Kjerknesvågen, Mosvik, Røra, Sandvollan, Sakshaug, and Utøy. Each has its own primary school and community centre.

Municipal council
The municipal council of Inderøy is made up of 25 representatives that are elected to four-year terms. The party breakdown of the council is as follows:

Mayors
The mayors of Inderøy:

1838–1843: Lorents Oxaal  	
1843–1849: Lorents D. Muus 	
1849–1853: Jørgen Buck 	
1854–1861: Herman Løchen  	
1862–1863: Sivert Bragstad  	
1864–1875: Ole Richter
1876–1885: Peter Hægstad  	
1886–1889: J.C. Tiller (V)
1890–1891: Ole Braa (V)
1892–1895: J.C. Tiller (V)
1896–1904: Ole Braa (V)
1905–1916: Ole Haugum (V)
1917–1919: Hans Melhus (V)
1920-1922: Ole Haugum (V)
1923–1925: Hans Melhus (Bp)
1926–1927: John Snerting (V)
1927–1929: Hans Hjulstad (Bp)
1930–1931: Olaf Ulstad (Bp)
1932–1934: John Snerting (V)
1935–1937: Olaf Ulstad (Bp)
1938-1938: Hans Hjulstad (Bp)
1938–1945: Anders Haugum V/NS)
1945-1945: Bjarne Lyngstad (V)
1946–1947: Paul Hjulstad (Ap)
1948–1951: Bjarne Lyngstad (V)
1952–1957: Hans Melhus (Bp)
1958–1959: Bjarne Lyngstad (V)
1959-1959: Hans Melhus (Bp)
1960–1961: Trygve Wang (Sp)
1962–1967: Kåre Sjøvold (Ap)
1968–1971: Olav Andreas Moen (Sp)
1972–1975: Kåre Sjøvold (Ap)
1976–1983: Anders Lyngstad (Sp)
1984–1987: Kåre Sjøvold (Ap)
1988–1990: Arild Vist (Ap)
1990–1995: Karin Kjølmoen (Ap)
1995–2003: Ole Tronstad (Sp)
2003–2007: Svein Jørum (Ap)
2007–2011: Ole Tronstad (Sp)
2011-present: Ida Stuberg (Sp)

Economy

Inderøy is primarily an agricultural area. Most of the municipality is cultivated, with grass and grains being the most common crops, but strawberries are also common. Most farmers also have forests. All dominant industry is oriented around agriculture, with factories producing distillery products (Sundnes Brenneri), animal feed, flat bread, jam, and juice (Røra Fabrikker), chickens, and other meat products. In addition there are numerous farms who manufacture their own produce and sell it on the farm.

There are also a number of service institutions in Inderøy, including stores, public services, and schools (including Utøy School). Quite a lot of people work in the neighboring municipalities of Levanger, Steinkjer, and Verdal—Inderøy being a suburb of those.

Geography
Inderøy is located on two peninsulas (Fosen and Inderøya) in the inner sections of the Trondheimsfjord, bordering the municipalities of Indre Fosen, Levanger, Steinkjer, Verdal, and Verran. The Skarnsund strait lies between the Inderøy and Mosvik peninsulas in the center of the municipality, and it connects the main Trondheimsfjord with the inner Beitstadfjord. The lake Meltingvatnet lies along the Leksvik border in southern Inderøy.

Transportation
The Nordland Line runs through Røra, and Røra Station is served hourly or more often by the Trøndelag Commuter Rail. European route E6 also runs through Røra. It connects to Norwegian National Road 755 that runs through Sakshaug and onwards to Utøy and Mosvik. At Straumen, the road crosses the preserved Straumen Bridge and on the Inderøy–Mosvik border where it crosses the Skarnsund Bridge. National Road 761 runs from Sakshaug north through Sandvollan before intersecting with E6 south of Steinkjer. There is a limited bus service provided by TrønderBilene.

Culture

There are a number of cultural activities in Inderøy. The Inderøy Upper Secondary School has a music, dance, and drama line, and the county's music service is also located in Straumen. Quite a number of local activities are oriented around culture, including the annual jazz festival Soddjazz. There is also a gallery, Nils Aas Kunstverksted and numerous small artist workshops. The newspaper Inderøyningen is published in Straumen and covers the municipality.

Attractions
Most tourist attractions are connected to The Golden Detour. Among these are local farms and a distillery that sell locally produced foods and beverages, as well as artist workshops and a fishing centre.

Notable residents

Public Service & public thinking 
 Ole Richter (1829 in Inderøya – 1888) lawyer, politician, Prime Minister of Norway 1884-1888
 Christian Leden (1882 in Inderøy – 1957) Arctic explorer, scientist and composer
 Bjarne Lyngstad (1901 in Inderøy – 1971) a Norwegian politician, Mayor of Inderøy 1947-1952
 Albert Lange Fliflet (1908 in Inderøy – 2001) a philologist and translator, translated Kalevala
 Inger Lise Gjørv (1938–2009) politician, County Governor of Nord-Trøndelag, lived in Sandvollan
 Karin Kjølmoen (born 1946 in Steinkjer) a Norwegian politician, Mayor of Inderøy 1990-1995

The Arts 

 Olaug Løken (1854 at Sundnes – 1925) a Norwegian writer and women's rights activist.
 Håkon Løken (1859 in Inderøy – 1923) journalist, lawyer, editor and non-fiction writer
 Johannes B. Wist (1864 at Sund – 1923) a Norwegian American journalist and author
 Gudrun Løchen Drewsen (1867 in Inderøy – 1946) American women's rights activist and painter
 Nils Aas (1933 in Inderøy – 2004) a Norwegian sculptor and artist
 Per Egil Hegge (born 1940) journalist; former editor of Aftenposten, brought up in Inderøy 
 Hanne Aga (1947 in Røra − 2019) a Norwegian poet
 Jon Øivind Ness (born 1968) a Norwegian contemporary composer
 Ingrid Bolsø Berdal (born 1980 in Utøy) a Norwegian actress

Sport 
 Ivar Ramstad (1924 in Inderøy – 2009) a Norwegian discus thrower, competed at the 1948 Summer Olympics
 Lorns Skjemstad (born 1940 in Inderøy) a retired Norwegian cross-country skier, competed in the 1968 Winter Olympics
and

References

External links

Municipal fact sheet from Statistics Norway 
The Golden Detour

 
Municipalities of Trøndelag
1838 establishments in Norway